Chester Junction Golf Club Platform served Chester Golf Club in Chester, England, from 1896 to 1927 on the Chester & Connah's Quay Railway.

History 
The station was opened on 18 May 1896 by the Manchester, Sheffield & Lincolnshire Railway. It was situated to the east of what was Chester Junction, now part of the Dee Marshes cycling route. On the southbound platform was a waiting shelter as well as a signal box. To the northwest was the golf club that this station was named after. It wasn't shown in public timetables as it was only used by members of the nearby golf club. The station closed on 20 September 1927. The site was converted into a cycle path in 2000.

References

External links 

Disused railway stations in Cheshire
Railway stations in Great Britain opened in 1896
Railway stations in Great Britain closed in 1927
1896 establishments in England
1927 disestablishments in England